is a Japanese actress. She won the Grand Prix award at the Super Heroine Audition Miss Phoenix in 2005.

Filmography

Dramas
  (2006)  - as Rieko Ishikawa (lead)
  (2008) - as Nanase Hida (Tanaka) (lead)
  (2009) - as Hidemi Furusawa (lead)
  (2010) - as Yamamoto Tamiko
 37.5°C no Namida (2015) - as Momoko
 Beppin san (2016)
 Dokonimo nai Kuni (2018)
 An Incurable Case of Love (2020) - as Wakabayashi Minori
 Uzukawamura Jiken (2022) - as Hitomi

Movies
  (2006) - as a servant of Inugami family
  (2007) - as Mayu Yajima
  (2007) - as Kazumi Saitō (lead)
 DIVE!! (2008) - as Kyōko Nishikawa
  (2008) - as Megumi Koga (Voice)
  (2009) - as Misako/Misae (dual role)
 The Shock Labyrinth 3D (2009) - as Yuki Tōyama
 Hanamizuki (2010) - as Ritsuko Watanabe, Kouhei's wife
 Kimi ni Todoke (2010) - as Yoshida Chizuru
 River (2011)
 The Snow White Murder Case (2014) as Risako Kano
 The Emperor in August (2015)
 Fullmetal Alchemist (2017) as Riza Hawkeye
 The Memory Eraser (2020)
 Godai: The Wunderkind (2020) as Toyoko
 Fullmetal Alchemist: The Revenge of Scar (2022) as Riza Hawkeye
 Fullmetal Alchemist: The Final Alchemy (2022) as Riza Hawkeye
 2 Women (2022)
 Home Sweet Home (2023)

References

External links
 Misako Renbutsu official website (Japanese)

1991 births
21st-century Japanese actresses
Living people
Actors from Tottori Prefecture